This is a list National Collegiate Athletic Association (Philippines) track and field champions. The school with the highest number of cumulative points wins the championship.

Like other NCAA events, there are two championships that are awarded, the Seniors division and the Juniors division championships. The championships are held on an outdoors.

Champions

Number of championships per school

NOTE
 LSGH won five (5) championships as juniors to DLSC/DLSU and two (2) championships as juniors to CSB.

See also
UAAP Track and Field Championship

Track and Field (Athletics)
National athletics competitions
Recurring sporting events established in 1925
Athletics competitions in the Philippines